D.A.V, Public School Sreshtha Vihar (DAVSV) is a part of the Dayanand Anglo-Vedic Schools System spread over India and Pakistan. The school is located in the heart of East Delhi in Sreshtha Vihar, Delhi.

It is a co-ed school, established in March 1989. It has a nursery school building with classes LKG-1st, and classes 2nd-12th in the main school building. It is CBSE affiliated. The school's motto is "ASPIRE ACT ACHIEVE".

Infrastructure 
The school has 90 classrooms and two libraries: one in the nursery wing and the other in the main school building. It also has laboratories for physics, chemistry, biology, fashion technology and bio-technology. Unfortunately the school lacks in sports as it does not have its own playground. It only has an assembly cum basketball court for PT (PHYSICAL TRAINING) period for students. Although the school rents the playground of Yamuna Sports Complex as and when required for inter-school sports competitions for selected students.

Facilities 
Facilities provided to the students include sports,cocurricular activities, counselling and special education. Counselling is provided to both parents and students.
An Auditorium with sitting capacity of 500 is fully utilised for cultural and educational activities.Special assemblies are held to celebrate important days and events 

Vedic Hawan is held daily at the magnificent Yagyashala in the school premises.This helps in instilling values and discipline amongst students.

School houses 
The school has a system of four houses: Ramanujan, Madam Curie, Picasso and Amrita Shergill. These are represented by green, red, yellow and blue respectively.

Cultural activities 
The school holds an annual day in which students perform different arts and dance forms which are prepared under the guidance of teachers.
Primary class students take part in Creativity Week which is full of activities that helps in proper cognitive and motor skills.
Effusion and Techesta is an inter school event where students from various schools compete in the field of art,music,debate,drama ,quiz and IT.

The school also holds an annual sports day and various competitions. Students, teachers and staff members participate in these competitions.

Principals 
Goldy Malhotra, former principal, is presently principal of Modern School, Vasant Vihar, New Delhi. 
Mrs. Premlata Garg has retired from the post of principal in 2020.
New Principal is yet to join the duties.
Mrs Suhasini K Nath joined as Principal in April 2020.She is M.Sc,M.Phil and has 30 years of teaching experience.

Achievements 
Premlata Garg received the 'National Award to Teachers 2011' from the President. She was also given the Woman of the Year Award by the Delhi Gynaecologist Forum & WOW India for her contribution to the field of education and social work.
Suhasini K Nath received State Teachers Award from Chief Minister in 2017,Certificate of honour from MR Vijay Goel

References

External links
 Official website
 D.A.V Public School Sreshtha Vihar at wikimapia

Schools in East Delhi
Educational institutions established in 1989
1989 establishments in Delhi
Schools affiliated with the Arya Samaj